The 1977 NCAA Division I Basketball Championship Game took place on March 28, 1977, between the North Carolina Tar Heels and the Marquette Warriors at The Omni in Atlanta, Georgia. The matchup was the final one of the thirty-ninth consecutive NCAA Division I Men's Basketball Championship single-elimination tournament — commonly referred to as the NCAA Tournament — organized by the National Collegiate Athletic Association (NCAA) and is used to crown a national champion for men's basketball at the Division I level.

Box score

Source:

References

Citations

Bibliography

NCAA Division I Basketball Championship Game
NCAA Division I Men's Basketball Championship Games
Marquette Golden Eagles men's basketball
North Carolina Tar Heels men's basketball
College sports in Georgia (U.S. state)
Basketball competitions in Atlanta
NCAA Division I Basketball Championship Game
NCAA Division I Basketball Championship Game